The 1922–23 season was Real Madrid Club de Fútbol's 21st season in existence. The club played some friendly matches. They also played in the Campeonato Regional Centro (Central Regional Championship), the Copa del Rey and the inaugural edition of the Copa Federación Centro (Central Federation Cup).

Summary
Real Madrid left the Campo de O'Donnell and adopted the Campo de Ciudad Lineal as their new home stadium. The Copa del Rey quarterfinal first-leg match against Athletic Bilbao on 25 March 1923 was the club's last home match at the O'Donnell. Real Madrid defeated Real Unión 2-0 in the inaugural match played at the Ciudad Lineal on 29 April 1923.

Friendlies

Competitions

Overview

Campeonato Regional Centro

League table

Matches

Copa del Rey

Quarter-finals

Copa Federación Centro

Notes

References

Real Madrid
Real Madrid CF seasons